The Effingham Daily News is a daily newspaper serving Effingham, Illinois, and surrounding portions of Clay, Cumberland, Effingham, Fayette, Jasper, Marion and Shelby counties, Illinois. It is owned by Community Newspaper Holdings Inc.

Four newspapers merged in July 1946 to form the Effingham Daily News—the Effingham Daily Record, Effingham Democrat, Effingham Republican and County Review. The McNaughton family, which owned the paper for 46 years, sold it to Park Communications in December 1992.  The paper was sold again in 1996 to Media General Inc., and to CNHI in 1997. Hollinger International bought the paper in December 1998, but sold it back to CNHI two years later.

References

External links 
 Daily News Website
 CNHI Website

Newspapers published in Illinois
Effingham County, Illinois